Ouarzazate Province is a province in the administrative region of Drâa-Tafilalet, Morocco. Its population in 2004 was 499,980.

The major cities and towns are:

 Ouarzazate
 Skoura
 Tabounte
 Taznakht



Subdivisions
The province is divided administratively into the following:

References

External links

 
Ouarzazate Province